Tardiphaga  is a genus of bacteria from the family Nitrobacteraceae.

References

Further reading 

 

Nitrobacteraceae
Bacteria genera
Monotypic bacteria genera